A Good Woman is a novel by Danielle Steel, published by Delacorte Press in October 2008. The book is Steel's seventy-sixth best selling novel.

Plot summary

Annabelle Worthington was born into a life of privilege in the glamorous New York society set living on Fifth Avenue and in Newport, Rhode Island. In April 1912, everything changed when the Titanic sank, changing her world forever. Annabelle then pours herself into volunteer work, nursing the poor, igniting a passion for medicine that would shape the course of her life.

More grief is around the corner with her first love and marriage to Josiah Millbank, a family friend. Betrayed by a scandal undeserved, Annabelle flees New York for war-ravaged France, to lose herself in a world of helping others in the First World War field hospital run by women. After the war, Annabelle become a Parisian doctor and becomes a mother living happily until a coincidental meeting reminds her of her former life to which she returns stronger and braver than before, a new woman to fight against the overwhelming odds thrown against her in life.

Footnotes
http://daniellesteel.com/blog/a-good-woman/

2008 American novels
American romance novels
Novels by Danielle Steel
Random House books
Novels set during World War I
Novels set in Paris
Novels about RMS Titanic
Delacorte Press books